Samael Aun Weor (March 6, 1917 – December 24, 1977), born Víctor Manuel Gómez Rodríguez, was a spiritual teacher and author of over sixty books of esoteric spirituality. He taught and formed groups under the banner of "Universal Gnosticism", or simply gnosis. A prolific author of syncretistic books, Gómez first made a name in the early gnostic movement in his native country of Colombia, before moving to Mexico in 1956, where his movement gained increased popularity, and his works became popular among practitioners of occultism and esotericism, and were translated to other languages.

Following his self-described "awakening" or "initiation" in 1948, Gómez started calling himself Aun Weor, which according to his own words would mean "the verb or messenger of God." In 1954, after undergoing a ceremony he described as the birth of "Inner Christ," he adopted the name of Samael Aun Weor, which he used until his death in 1977. Samael Aun Weor referred to his teachings as "The Doctrine of Synthesis", which not only emphasizes the existence of the perennial philosophy, but that its highest teleological function is the accomplishment of "Christification" and "Final Liberation".

Biography

Early life
Victor Manuel Gómez Rodriguez was born in Bogotá, Cundinamarca, Republic of Colombia, son of Manuel Gómez Quijano and Francisca Rodríguez de Gómez. He was baptized in the Roman Catholic Church, but later rejected the Church of Rome. His childhood and family life are not well known, except that he had a brother, and his father remarried after a divorce.

He was sent to a Roman Catholic Jesuit school but soon dropped out, disappointed by religion; he was twelve years old at the time. Instead he said he invested most of his time in the study of metaphysical and esoteric treatises. At the age of 17, he was asked to lecture at the local Theosophical Chapter, and a year later was admitted into the occult society Fraternitas Rosicruciana Antiqua (F.R.A.).

Early adult life, marriages, and children
Few details of his life are known between the mid-1930s and 1950. He became a spiritual vagabond of sorts, traveling with neither home nor income. At one point he said he had lived with a tribe of indigenous people in the Sierra Nevada de Santa Marta in northern Colombia, learning the healing secrets which would later form the foundation of his medical treatise, Occult Medicine and Practical Magic. It was also during these years that he described his first experience of the Illuminating Void meeting his "Inner Being" or Atman whose name is "Aun Weor", meaning in Hebrew "Light and Strength".

He was briefly married to Sara Dueños and they had a son named "Imperator". However, in 1946, he met and married the Lady-Adept "Litelantes" (born Arnolda Garro Mora) with whom he lived for 31 years and had four children: Osiris, Isis, Iris, and Hypatia. Samael Aun Weor explains that as soon as he met her, this "Lady-Adept" Genie began to instruct him in the Science of Jinnestan or Jinn State also known as Djinn State or Djinnestan, which involved placing the physical body in the fourth dimension. In Aztec religion this practice is known as Nahuatlism, and according to Aun Weor it is related with hyperspace.

Career as an occult teacher

By 1948 he had started teaching a small group of students. In 1950, under the name "Aun Weor", he managed to publish The Perfect Matrimony, or The Door to Enter into Initiation with the help of his close disciples. The book, later entitled The Perfect Matrimony,  unveiled the secret of sexuality as the cornerstone of the world's great religions. In it he addressed topics such as sexual transmutation, "white tantra", and esoteric initiation.

According to his diary, writing about sex in such a candid manner was met with disdain by the majority of the public at the time. Seen as immoral and pornographic, Aun Weor found himself fleeing angry mobs attempting to silence him through violent means. From March 14 to 19 of 1952 Aun Weor spent five days in jail for "committing the crime of healing the sick".) The account of his incarceration is recounted in a personal diary he later published as Secret Notes of a Guru.

After March 19, 1952, Aun Weor and some disciples built and lived near the Summum Supremum Sanctuarium, an "underground temple" in the Sierra Nevada de Santa Marta in Colombia. On October 27, 1954, Aun Weor received what is referred to as the "Initiation of Tiphereth", which, according to his doctrine, is the beginning of the incarnation of the Logos or "Glorian" within the soul. He states that in his case the name of his Glorian has always been called "Samael" through the ages. From then on, he would sign his name Samael Aun Weor.

Aun Weor stated that this union of Samael (the Logos) with Aun Weor (the human soul) is the Maitreya Buddha Kalki Avatar of the New Age of Aquarius. Upon being asked exactly what such a title meant, he replied:

Although he would declare himself as the true Kalki Avatar many times throughout his works, he also regularly rejected the cult of his personality:

Living in Mexico City
In 1956, he left Colombia and went to Costa Rica and El Salvador. Later in 1956, he settled permanently in Mexico City, where he would begin his public life.

Before 1960, he had arguably published 20 more books with topics ranging from endocrinology and criminology to kundalini yoga. He founded numerous Gnostic Institutions and created Gnostic centers in Mexico, Panama, El Salvador, Costa Rica, Venezuela. A "triangle" relationship was established between the Universal Gnostic Movement founded by Samael Aun Weor, the South American Liberation Action (ALAS) in Argentina headed by Francisco A. Propato Ph.D. (graduate of La Sorbonne and Spanish translator of The Rubaiyat of Omar Khayyam), and the Sivananda Aryabarta Ashram directed by Swami Sivananda in India.

In spite of its success, the development of the Gnostic Movement was not without dramatic setbacks, according to its followers. By the time of publishing the revised edition of The Perfect Matrimony (1961), the movement had fallen apart. Aun Weor wrote that "those who did not leave the Gnostic Movement can be counted on the fingers of one hand." However, by the time of his death, Samael Aun Weor had completely re-established the broad international reaches the movement previously held.

Into the 1960s, he continued to write many books on topics, such as hermetic astrology, flying saucers, and the Kabbalah. However, he also wrote sociopolitical works such as the Platform of POSCLA (Partido Socialista Cristiano Latinoamericano, or Latin-American Christian Socialist Party) and The Social Christ. Topics such as the "false" doctrines of wall street materialism, atheism, and particularly Marxism-Leninism are discussed. POSCLA's motto was given as, "All for one and one for all," and its method, the conscious practice of ahimsa.

Final written work
In what was to be the last decade of his life, he penned works such as Parsifal Unveiled, which details the esoteric symbolism of the Wagner opera, and Gnostic Anthropology in which he heavily criticized the theories of Darwin, Haeckel, "and their followers". The books The Great Rebellion, Treatise of Revolutionary Psychology, and The Revolution of the Dialectic provide a ground work for the vast knowledge of esoteric psychology purported to be found rooted in every genuine religion. During this time, he was preparing the highest vehicle of his doctrine, The Pistis Sophia Unveiled, in which he meditated, verse-by-verse, upon the extremely esoteric Gnostic text Pistis Sophia.

Death
By 1972, Samael Aun Weor wrote that his death and resurrection would be occurring before 1978. In the chapter entitled The Resurrection, in his work The Three Mountains (1972), he stated that the eight years of ordeals within the Trial of Job would occur between his 53rd and 61st birthdays. Furthermore, in the same work, it is stated that this ordeal occurs prior to resurrection, and the one going through it is "deprived of everything, even of his own sons, and is afflicted by an impure sickness." By August 1977 he had developed stomach cancer. During this time he continued to speak to both his students and the general public, giving radio and television interviews while touring Mexico. Eventually he was forced to stop, due to debilitating stomach pain. As his condition steadily worsened, he would mention to those at his bedside, "Don't cling to my battered body, instead cling to my doctrinal body." Aun Weor died on December 24, 1977. He was survived by his wife and children.

Years before his death, he declared he would adopt the use of a duly prepared ancient Egyptian "mummy" as a vehicle for further work, a vehicle better prepared than his own "physical body". Many of his followers expected him to return publicly shortly after his death. According to his own statements he planned to remain incognito for a certain time so that “the leaven will ferment.”

Doctrine of Synthesis 

The Doctrine of Synthesis is a term Aun Weor used to describe the teachings he delivered through his books and lectures, because it purportedly elucidates and coherently syncretizes an extensive variety of teachings which study the human condition.

Although many of the metaphysical concepts expounded by such authors as Blavatsky, Steiner, and Gurdjieff provide a conceptual foundation in Aun Weor's teachings, he considered these works and movements conceptual preparation for the real unveiling of occultism or gnosis that he taught. His primary goal was not to simply elucidate myriad metaphysical concepts, but rather to teach the way to achieve self-realization through the "Direct Path of Christ". As he states in The Perfect Matrimony: "We aspire towards only one thing, only one goal, only one objective: Christification. It is necessary for each human being to Christify himself. It is necessary to incarnate the Christ."

Aun Weor emphasizes that his doctrine is experiential, and must be put into practice for it to be of any value to the student. Throughout his works there are hundreds of techniques and exercises that are of help in the development of psychic powers, for example leaving the dense physical body at will (astral projection), in order to be taught in the schools of the "Higher Worlds." The techniques are always combined with meditation and sexual transmutation, and the perfection of such powers may take more than one lifetime.

It is stated that if a student is successful in awakening consciousness, he or she will eventually experience a continuous state of vigilance not only during the day but also while the physical body is sleeping, and most importantly after death. This is significant because Aun Weor states that those who have a sleeping consciousness are not aware of their postmortem condition, just as they are not aware when they are physically sleeping. The awakening of consciousness allows a student to continue to work regardless of their physical state.

Religion

Religions are viewed as idiosyncratic expressions of immutable and eternal values. Religions are said to be born and die in time, yet their spiritual values always remain eternal. When a religious form has fulfilled its mission, it begins to degenerate and dies, then a new messenger appears and delivers a doctrine appropriate for that culture. Different cultures require different doctrines for their development and this results in a vast difference of religious doctrines. Nevertheless, if one understands their core values, all religions naturally support each other. It is stated that any authentic religion possess what are called "The Three Factors of the Revolution of the Consciousness" which are practical aspects of daily life:

Death: The psychological work of eliminating the ego.
Birth: Giving birth to the superior potential of the soul, which is done through chastity and sexual transmutation.
Sacrifice: To work to aid suffering humanity "without desiring the fruits of action, without desiring reward; pure, sincere, disinterested sacrifice, giving one's life in order for others to live, and without asking for anything in return."

Among these 3 factors, Aun Weor highlights that the first one is the most important. 
A teaching that is missing any one of these components is considered incomplete or degenerate.

Psychology

The basis of Aun Weor's practical work is of a psychological nature. He states in many of his books that the purpose of his doctrine is to affect a psychological change. The terms Gnostic, Esoteric or Revolutionary Psychology are used to describe the psychological methods taught, and are said to be synonymous with the psychological teachings of religion.

A fundamental axiom presented is that an ordinary human being is not really human at all, but rather an intellectual animal (a rational animal) with consciousness asleep. According to Samael Aun Weor, a true human being is someone who has no psychological imperfection, an image of God, as in Jesus' saying, "Become perfect as your Father in Heaven is perfect." Aun Weor writes of the awakening of consciousness as being very similar to the traditional Buddhist understanding, and throughout his works he describes many analogous processes as they are spoken of in different religions.

In order to awaken the consciousness correctly, Aun Weor stated it was necessary to annihilate the ego. He taught that one's ego is really not one but many, or a multitude of independent, contradictory desires. Likewise, each person's ego is said to actually contain many "I's," many "egos," many "aggregates." Each desire is an "I" and each "I" has its own specific causes and conditions that lead to its personification at a particular time. This is the mechanism behind what is commonly called "changing one's mind" (metanoia) because when one "I" changes to another a literal exchange of personified psychological aggregates has taken place. This "doctrine of the many", the Plural 'I' or Pluralized Ego, is the same as that taught by G.I. Gurdjieff and his disciple P. D. Ouspensky and is one of the reasons Aun Weor was sometimes accused of plagiarism. To this he responded that Gurdjieff was not the author of this doctrine and that its origin is found in Egypt and Tibet.

Consciousness

Consciousness is described as a state of being, very closely related to God. The consciousness within the normal person is said to be 97% asleep. Consciousness asleep is consciousness that is subconscious, unconscious, or infraconscious, which are various levels of psychological sleep. Psychological sleep is a way to describe the lack of self-awareness, meaning that the common and ordinary person is not aware of 97% of what constitutes the ordinary state of being. A consciousness asleep is caused by what Aun Weor calls identification, fascination, or the incorrect transformation of impressions, which all imply a type of consciousness that is not aware of its own processes. It is said that to awaken consciousness one must understand that his or her consciousness is asleep. This implies that one must begin to understand every impulse, action, thought and movement one makes, a feat that is said to be accomplished through the mental discipline of meditation and self-observation. Furthermore, it is stated that the awakening of consciousness is the only way to acquiring gnosis and achieve a true and radical change by removing the spurious psychological aggregates that cause unnecessary suffering. The awakening of consciousness goes hand in hand with the transmutation of sexual energy because the higher states of consciousness depend upon the energy of sexual transmutation.

Psychological aggregates

The purpose of the psychological work is to dissolve all the psychological aggregates one has accumulated. Aun Weor states that this specific paradigm is called "The Doctrine of the Many" and has been taught in esoteric schools and religions since the beginning of time. The anatomy of the pluralized self being the divine spark imprisoned within hundreds of psychological aggregates.

In order to achieve psychological transformation, extensive methods of meditation, self-observation, and sexual transmutation are taught and prescribed for daily exercise. The goal of psychological work is the awakening of consciousness and ultimately the state of Paramarthasatya.

Physiology and sexology

Basic physiology is studied, mostly endocrinology and the hormonal influence of primary and secondary sexual characteristics. It is taught that there are three fundamental nervous systems, the cerebrospinal nervous system, grand sympathetic nervous system, and the parasympathetic nervous system. These nervous systems are referred to as the "Three Brains" or three centers of the intellectual animal, and are named the intellectual center, the emotional center, and the motor-instinctual-sexual center. Each center is studied in relation to the types of energies or "occult hydrogens" that animate them, the frequency at which each center operates (sexual center being the fastest, then emotional, then intellectual), and how psychological aggregates form and act within each center: psychological aggregates that are expressed through the intellect one way and through the emotions in a different way.

Three centers and three traitors
The three centers are directly related to the Trinity, Trimurti, or threefoldness of creation, the intellect being related to the Father (Kether, affirmation, positive), the emotion related to the Son (Chokmah, denial, negation), and the sexual center related to the Holy Spirit (Binah, reconcile, neutral). The primary energy of the intellectual brain (Father) is the air, which is then placed in the bloodstream which is related to the emotional brain (Son), and lastly the final condensation of blood is found in the semen or sexual hormones, which is directly related to the Holy Spirit: that which impregnates or manifests creation, Shakti, etc.

Aun Weor teaches that psychological aggregates form in one of these three centers; therefore, it is said that there are three fundamental defects: the demon of the mind related to the intellectual center, the demon of desire related to the emotional center, and the demon of evil will related to the motor-instinctual-sexual center. They are collectively referred to as the "Three Traitors", and many references to religion are found that are held to symbolize them, for example: Judas (desire), Pilate (intellect), and Caiaphas (will) who crucify Jesus; Jubela, Jubelo, and Jubelum who murder Hiram Abiff; Seth, in the form of the serpent Apophis and its two monstrous helpers Sebau and Nakmurders Osiris; the three Furies who attack Orestes; the three daughters of Mara who attack Gautama Buddha and who are conquered through right Thinking (Intellectual Center), right Feeling (Emotional Center), and right Action (Motor-Instinctual-Sexual Center) (see Noble Eightfold Path).

Lunar and solar bodies
Occult or esoteric anatomy and physiology is also studied, which refers to the study of the supra-sensible bodies of minerals, plants, animals (rational and irrational), and human beings. It is said that everyone contains seven bodies, closely related to the Theosophical septenary, which Aun Weor calls physical, vital, emotional (astral), mental, causal, buddhic and atmic. Aun Weor differentiates between an intellectual animal and an authentic human being through the differences in the vehicles of emotion (astral body), mind (mental body) and will (causal body). Intellectual animals (ordinary man and woman) are said to contain the Lunar Astral Body, the Lunar Mental Body, and the Lunar Causal Body, each referred to by different names in different schools of Occultism. It is stated that these lunar bodies are the result of mechanical evolution through the mineral, plant and animal kingdoms and therefore, they are of an infrahuman or animal quality. The only true difference between the rational animal and irrational animals is the intellect, which gives the former the ability to become human, or as Aun Weor states, the intellectual animal has the "seed" or potential of a human latently existing within its sexual organs.

What are called authentic human beings, although physically appearing identical, have crystallized the solar bodies: solar astral body, solar mental body, and solar causal body. Lunar bodies are vehicles that receive the energy of creation (that is, God) at the level of an animal, while the solar bodies permit the reception of a much greater voltage allowing greater levels of wisdom and superior emotion to be incarnated. Aun Weor states that the solar bodies are collectively referred to as vehicles of the "soul".

Aun Weor states that the solar bodies are formed in the same manner that physical bodies are formed: through use of the sexual function. In order to form the solar bodies, sexual transmutation is taught via the hetero sexual magic of married couples engaged in coitus without orgasm or seminal ejaculation. Sexual magic is the arousal of sexual energies through the act of coitus between husband and wife, but instead of expelling those energies through orgasm they are transmuted into higher octaves of energy. Each successive Solar Body is the result of the saturation of transmuted sexual energy at its respective octave: first, the "Christ Astral" is formed by transmuting the sex energy into a second octave; second, the "Christ Mind" is formed by saturating, condensing or crystallizing the sexual energy into a third octave, and the causal body or "Christ Will" is formed by transmuting the sexual energy called "Hydrogen SI-12", into a fourth octave. The "birth" of the solar bodies is what Aun Weor states is the true meaning of being "born again." It is taught that the solar bodies are referred to in the Bible as the three sons of Noah or the three companions of Daniel in the (alchemical) furnace of Nebuchadnezzar.

Three forms of sexuality

The topic of sexuality is approached from a very stern point of view, and it is indeed the crux of Aun Weor's entire message. He states that there are three fundamental types of sexuality: suprasexuality, which is the sexual functioning of someone like Buddha or Jesus, who naturally transmutes all their energy perfectly; normal sexuality, which is defined as those who have no sexual conflict of any kind whatsoever and who transmute their sexual energy or use it to procreate the species; finally, the two spheres of infrasexuality, as described in the Kabbalistic texts: Nahemah's sphere of influence which includes fornication, adultery, addiction and prostitution and Lilith's sphere of influence, a category which includes homosexuality, masturbation, abortion, bestiality, sado-masochism and any other "abuse" of the sexual energy. In response to his harsh views towards sex (especially for a "New Age" teacher), he wrote:

Soteriology

Soteriology (study of salvation) is presented in the light of every notable religion yet usually with special differences not held by orthodox interpretations. There are many degrees of salvation generally accomplished by paying one's karma, removing the psychological imperfections and finally creating the solar bodies. The idea held by many religions that belief in God alone achieves salvation is categorically rejected.

Many different levels of salvation are explained, each depending upon the willpower of the individual accomplishing it. For those who do not remove their psychological imperfection (ego) – which is the cause of karma and the suffering of humanity – after approximately 108 rebirths they will have their ego removed forcefully through mechanical devolution within the infradimensions (Hell). Here it is said that "Mother Nature" mechanically pays out one's accumulated karma through a great deal of suffering over thousands of years until one is returned to the state of an innocent elemental, or Essence. This is said to be a state of being that is total happiness, yet not cognizant happiness and therefore not complete happiness. Hell is not taught as a place of eternal damnation, just a place to pay one's karma, and in fact it is seen as a part of God's grace because if the ego is not removed forcefully, these souls would continue to suffer indefinitely. It is held that after Hell, the elemental is reinserted into the mechanics of evolution in order to once again attempt to gain conscious happiness: They are first inserted at the basic level of existence (minerals), and through millions of years, transmigrate through increasingly complex organisms until the state of intellectual animal is reached again.

For those who do work on themselves, depending on the degree of perfection, happiness and wisdom they wish to attain, two distinct paths emerge: the Straight Path of the Razor's Edge and the Spiral Path. The Spiral Path involves reaching a state of relative enlightenment by choosing the enjoyment of the Higher Worlds (Heaven or Nirvana), and occasionally returning to a physical body in order to pay out a little more karma and help humanity in the process. Aun Weor refers to these as the Pratyeka Buddhas and Sravakas, and that the vast majority who reach this state choose the Spiral Path because it is very easy and enjoyable. The dangerous Straight Path of the Razor's Edge is the Path of the Bodhisattva who renounces the happiness of the Higher Worlds (Nirvana) in order to help humanity. In the doctrine of Aun Weor, the Bodhisattva has a very specific definition, as it is not merely someone who has taken the Bodhisattva vows. It is the physical (Malkuth), vital (Yesod), astral (Hod), mental (Netzach) and causal (Tiphereth) vehicles – in other words the human soul – of a self-realized spirit, (Geburah-Chesed) who has chosen the Straight Path of the Razor's Edge in order to incarnate the Christ (Kether-Binah-Chokmah). In other words, the Bodhisattva is the "Son" of a self-realized God who is trying to return to the Absolute or 13th Aeon of the Pistis Sophia.

Christology

Christ is viewed as the savior but not as traditionally understood by contemporary Christianity. Instead, Christ is an impersonal force or intelligence that emanates from the Absolute as the Trinity and is also referred to as the Cosmic Christ. Christ is said to have existed before Jesus, and is represented in different traditions with names such as Thoth, Ormuz, Ahura Mazda, Osiris, Zeus, Jupiter, Quetzalcoatl, Okidanokh, Kulkulcan, Chrestos, Baldur, and Avalokitesvara. It is held that Christ enters into and exalts any individual who is properly prepared, which denotes the complete annihilation of the ego, the exhaustion of all karma and the birth of the solar vehicles, the latter is necessary to handle the super high voltage of Christ. Aun Weor writes that only those who choose the previously mentioned Straight Path of the Razor's Edge can incarnate the Christ because the Spiral Path is not a path of total sacrifice. Likewise, any true Bodhisattva has incarnated the Christ or is in process of doing so. It is said that in history Christ incarnated in Jesus, Buddha, Mohammed, Krishna, Moses, Padmasambhava, John the Baptist, Milarepa, Mahavatar Babaji, Joan of Arc, Fu Xi, Ramakrishna as well as many others now forgotten by time (or made up in works of fiction) e. g. Zanoni

It is important to notice that some of these individuals represent Christ as an impersonal force, e. g. Jesus, meaning that although he was an individual Christ, he taught the doctrine of the Cosmic Christ, intentionally molding his physical life after the psychological processes that one undergoes to incarnate the Christ. As with Buddha, Jesus is seen as a Bodhisattva who came to help humanity. Jesus is viewed as the Savior of the World because he is a Paramarthasatya (an inhabitant of the Absolute) that physically incarnated specifically for the sake of poor suffering humanity. According to Aun Weor, Jesus purposefully played out physically the internal or psychological struggle one must undergo in the path of Self-Realization; thus, the Gospels are a mixture of reality and kabbalistic, initiatic symbolism.
 According to Aun Weor, there is the historic Christ as depicted in Christian Churches; then, there is the Christ of Transubstantiation to be known exclusively through the Gnostic Church; and finally, there is the Apocalyptic Christ who is to come with the New Jerusalem, after the Great Cataclysm that will consume the world.

Anthropology
His work Cosmic Teachings of a Lama states that life on Earth did not occur through abiogenesis, but instead through pansperma. To Aun Weor, the theories of abiogenesis are similar to those of spontaneous generation, and that Pasteur had already implicitly refuted the former when the latter was empirically disproved. Furthermore, while evolution is a verified fact of nature, speciation through Darwinian evolution has never been witnessed and is "an absurd theory without basis or foundation." Instead, the sum of zoological variation is determined by the seeds of life traveling throughout space (protected by electromagnetic "whirlwinds") which determine the evolution and devolution of life on any planet. Life, according to Aun Weor, is eternal, however its expression is divided into evolutive and devolutive modes: species evolve, reach a pinnacle, and necessarily devolve and return to a germinal state.

Man, therefore, is not the outcome of the evolution from a common ancestor to the primates, but rather the exponent of an eternal anthropic principle.  Monkeys, apes, and other primates are instead the outcome of certain sub-sects of ancient humanity copulating with animals, and are in a complete state of devolution.

He does state however that evolution within a species is possible, yet that no species can evolve from another species. Furthermore, he states that the human or 'intellectual animal' naturally evolves in time, for example our society is an evolution from previous societies - however the evolution of species can never achieve spiritual liberation because it will always return to devolution. Spiritual liberation requires a 'revolution of consciousness'.

Eschatology 
In many books Aun Weor wrote about the "Final Catastrophe" or Apocalypse. His work The Aquarian Message is a commentary on the Book of Revelation, which affirms the notion that present civilization will end and a future one will emerge. Only those souls who remove their ego in the present time will avoid the Second Death and re-transmigrations. A specific date is never given, only that this civilization is in the twilight of its existence.

The Social Christ and POSCLA
Aun Weor wrote about social problems in the books The Social Christ and The Social Transformation of Humanity. The Social Christ  is primarily concerned with a comprehensive critique of Marxism or Dialectical Materialism, but deals also with the injustices of the Capitalist system;

We are filled with horror in the presence of so much infamy. The ones that cannot pay for a stall in the public markets are persecuted, but they flatter and butter up the powerful gentlemen that steal millions of pesos from the people.In this way the capitalists fertilize the soil and prepare it in order that in it the filthy flower of Communism can germinate.

All political systems, Aun Weor states, are a reflection of our own psychology, and he explains that in order to finally finish with oppression it is necessary to change our own psychological state through the Death of Ego, combining this with non-violent resistance and the unionization of workers.The struggle for the triumph of social justice is very long and hard, but we must never use violence, nor revolutions of blood and liquor.

In order "to start a new age and realize the Social Christ on the face of the earth," Aun Weor formed a political party called 'POSCLA', The Christian Socialist Party of Latin America, which he later disbanded as a formal organization.

Medicine and elemental magic

In his works, Occult Medicine and Practical Magic, Igneous Rose and others, Aun Weor taught about elemental magic. In the former work he expressed his opposition to the medicine of modern science, allopathy, and called for the Gnostics to learn the ways of Indigenous and Elemental Medicine.

Aun Weor taught that all the plants of nature are living Elemental Spirits, similarly to Paracelsus and many other esoteric teachers. He states that it is the Elemental Spirits who cure, not simply the 'cadavers of the plants'. Plants should be treated as living beings, harvested at the proper hours etc. He stated that the Elementals of all plants are aspects of The Divine Mother in the form of Mother Nature. In 'Occult Medicine and Practical Magic' he spoke about the healing methods of the Kogi Mamas, who diagnose sicknesses by means of clairvoyance.

Criticism
The Roman Catholic Church has labeled Aun Weor's neo-Gnostic Movement as a pseudo-church and some Roman Catholic authors have accused Aun Weor of trying to seduce Roman Catholic priests and nuns to abandon their vows of celibacy and practice the sexual teachings promulgated by the neo-Gnostic Movement; these authors also believe that the current wave to discredit the legitimacy of the Roman Catholic Church comes from the same source while others go so far as to label it heresy.

As of 11 February 1984 or thereabouts, the Ministry of Tenerife, Spain, denied incorporation to Aun Weor's Universal Christian Gnostic Church of Spain operating from 38 San Francisco St., in Santa Cruz de Tenerife, Spain, on the grounds that said organization is not a legitimate church as it does not have any record of incorporation as such in any country whatsoever.

In 1990, after numerous consultations with high-ranking members of the Roman Catholic Church and other figures who preferred to remain anonymous such as lawyers, public prosecutors, psychiatrists and psychologists, Pilar Salarrullana, who has been a political figure since 1974 and is considered an expert on sects, published Las Sectas (The Sects: a living testament to Messianic terror in Spain), which became a best-seller with six editions the first year alone and, in spite of its popularly inquisitorial tone, it denounces the Gnostic Movements among others as some of the most dangerous anti-social plagues in Spain.

In 1991, F. W. Haack (1935–1991), who was chief delegate of the Evangelical Church with responsibility for sects and ideologies, attacked Weor's ideology in a German book published in Zürich — nevertheless, the Gnostic branches of the movement in Germany and Switzerland are still active and expanding. The Gnostic associations are active in Switzerland with a moderate following of Italian-, French- and German-speaking members.

Publishing
Glorian Publishing (formerly known as Thelema Press) is a non-profit organization translating and publishing the Gnostic books of Aun Weor.  Since 2001, Glorian has published books and operates Gnostic Radio (a free internet radio service) and a podcast.

Bibliography 
Aun Weor wrote over sixty books, covering a broad range of esoteric, philosophical, and anthropological subjects. The following is taken in part from the "Bibliography of Samael Aun Weor" although a more accurate list may exist.

 1950 - The Perfect Matrimony, or The Door to Enter into Initiation (Revised and expanded in 1961. See below) 
 1950 - The Revolution of Beelzebub, 2007 
 1951 - The Zodiacal Course, published in English as part of Practical Astrology, 2006 
 1952 - Secret Notes of a Guru
 1952 - Treatise of Occult Medicine and Practical Magic (Revised and expanded in 1978. See below) 
 1952 - Gnostic Catechism
 1952 - Christ Consciousness
 1952 - The Power is in the Cross
 1952 - The Book of the Virgin of Carmen
 1953 - The Seven Words (Included in the collection "The Divine Science," )
 1953 - Igneous Rose, 2007 
 1954 - The Manual of Practical Magic, published in English as part of Practical Astrology 
 1954 - Treatise of Sexual Alchemy
 1955 - The Mysteries of the Fire: Kundalini Yoga 
 1955 - Cosmic Ships 
 1956 - The Major Mysteries 
 1958 - The Magnum Opus
 1958 - Universal Charity
 1958 - Esoteric Treatise of Theurgy (Included in the collection "The Divine Science," )
 1959 - The Mountain of Juratena
 1959 - 'Fundamental Notions of Endocrinology and Criminology' 
 1959 - Christ Will
 1959 - Logos, Mantra, Theurgy (Included in the collection "The Divine Science," )
 1959 - The Yellow Book 
 1960 - The Aquarian Message 
 1961 - Introduction to Gnosis 
 1961 - The Perfect Matrimony (revised), 2009 
 1962 - The Mysteries of Life and Death (Included in the collection "Beyond Death" )
 1963 - Marriage, Divorce and Tantra (Included in "Introduction to Gnosis" )
 1963 - Gnosis in the Twentieth Century
 1963 - Great Supreme Universal Manifesto of the Gnostic Movement
 1964 - The Social Christ
 1964 - Christmas Message 1964-1965 ("The Dissolution of the I") Title given by students. Available as Elimination of Satan's Tail )
 1964 - Grand Gnostic Manifesto of the Third Year of Aquarius
 1965 - The Social Transformation of Humanity
 1965 - Supreme Christmas Message 1965-1966 
 1966 - The Book of the Dead (Included in the collection "Beyond Death" )
 1967 - Platform of POSCLA
 1967 - Christmas Message 1966-1967 
 1967 - An Esoteric Treatise of Hermetic Astrology, published in English as part of Practical Astrology 
 1967 - Christmas Message 1967-1968: The Solar Bodies and Gnostic Wisdom published in English as The Doomed Aryan Race, 2008 
 1967 - Flying Saucers, included in Cosmic Ships 
 1968 - Constitution and Liturgy of the Gnostic Movement (For Second and Third Chamber Students ONLY).
 1968 - We'll Reach the One Thousand, But Not the Two Thousand (Title given by students).
 1968 - Supreme Christmas Message 1967-1968
 1969 - Esoteric Course of Kabbalah, published in English as Alchemy & Kabbalah 
 1969 - Christmas Message 1968-1969: The Gnostic Magic of the Runes, 2007 
 1969 - Christmas Message 1969-1970: My Return to Tibet, a title given by students in Spanish and published in English as Cosmic Teachings of a Lama, 2007 
 1970 - Fundamental Education 
 1970 - Beyond Death 
 1971 - Christmas Message 1971-1972 (Parsifal Unveiled)
 1971 - Christmas Message 1971-1972: The Mystery of the Golden Blossom 
 1972 - Grand Gnostic Manifesto 1972
 1972 - Christmas Message 1972-1973: The Three Mountains, 2007 
 1972 - Gazing at the Mystery 
 1973 - Aztec Christic Magic  (Lessons date from 1957)
 1973 - Christmas Message 1973-1974 (Yes, There is a Hell, a Devil, and Karma) 
 1974 - The Metallic Planets of Alchemy
 1974 - The Secret Doctrine of Anahuac
 1975 - 'The Great Rebellion' 
 1975 - Liturgy of the Gnostic Movement (For Second and Third Chamber Students ONLY).
 1975 - Revolutionary Psychology 
 1976 - Sacred Book of Gnostic Liturgy (For Second and Third Chamber Students ONLY).
 1977 - The Mysteries of Christic Esoterism
 1977 - The Kabbalah of the Mayan Mysteries
 1977 - Esoteric Course of Theurgy (Included in the collection "The Divine Science," )
 1978 - Gnostic Anthropology' 
 1978 - Didactic Self-knowledge (Collected Lectures).
 1978 - Christmas Message 1977-1978: Treatise of Occult Medicine and Practical Magic (revised) 
 1978 - The Initiatic Path in the Arcana of Tarot and Kabbalah 
 1980 - For the Few
 1983 - The Revolution of the Dialectic 
 1983 - The Gnostic Bible: The Pistis Sophia Unveiled 
 1991-2014 - New Order Messages in Hight Octaves more Enlightenment, see at http://sawzone.org  and http://www.samaelsirio.com/index.html  (you can see and download all the New Order Messages).

See also 

 Astrotheology
 Esoteric Christianity
 Fourth Way
 List of messiah claimants
 Mysticism
 New religious movement
 Western esotericism

Notes

External links

 glorian.org English hub responsible for publishing Samael Aun Weor's complete literary estate including public lectures into English, under the name Glorian Publishing.
 Sacred-Sex.org Sister site of gnosticteachings.org which accumulates all known related texts from the East and West on the topic of Esoteric Sexuality.

1917 births
1977 deaths
Colombian autobiographers
Colombian emigrants to Mexico
Colombian occult writers
Cult leaders
Gnostics
Hermetic Qabalists
Mexican autobiographers
Mexican occultists
20th-century mystics
Founders of new religious movements
People from Bogotá
Spiritual teachers
Deaths from cancer in Mexico
Deaths from stomach cancer